The Rajiv Gandhi Combined Cycle Power Plant (also known as Rajiv Gandhi CCPP is a combined cycle power plant located at Choolatheruvu,Haripad in Alappuzha district, Kerala, India. The power plant is owned by NTPC Limited. The power plant is fueled by imported and indigenous naphtha. Source of the cooling water is Achankovil river at Nalukettumkavala in Pallipad.

Capacity 

There is a plan to expand the plant by three units with capacity of 350 MW each.  New units would be fueled by re-gasified liquefied natural gas.

References

External links
 NTPC Kayamkulam

Oil-fired power stations in Kerala
Natural gas-fired power stations in Kerala
Buildings and structures in Alappuzha district
1999 establishments in Kerala
Buildings and structures completed in 1999